Football at the 1962 Asian Games was held at the Tebet football pitch, Ikada Stadium, and Senayan Main Stadium in Jakarta, Indonesia from 25 August to 4 September 1962.

Medalists

Draw
The original draw for football competition was held on 14 August 1962.

Group A
 
 
 

Group B
 
 
 

Group C
 
 

Group D
 
 
 

Burma withdrew after the draw, while Israel and Taiwan withdrew after Indonesian immigration officials refused to issue visas for their delegations. The revised draw took place on 24 August 1962.

Group A
 
 
 
 

Group B

Squads

Results

Preliminary round

Group A

 Malaya won a draw for second place against Indonesia on 30 August 1962, necessary as they were both equal on points and goal average.

Group B

Knockout round

Semifinals

Bronze medal match

Gold medal match

Final standing

References

External links 
 De Dekker, Guy; Jovanovic, Bojan; Garin, Erik. "Asian Games 1962 (Indonesia)". RSSSF.

 
1962 Asian Games events
1962
Asian Games
1962 Asian Games